The women's slalom competition of the 2018 Winter Paralympics was held at Jeongseon Alpine Centre, South Korea on 18 March 2018.

Medal table

Visually impaired 
The first run was started at 09:30, with the second run at 12:30.

Standing 
The first run was started at 10:00, with the second run at 12:49.

Sitting 
The first run was started at 10:30, with the second run at 13:07.

References

Women's slalom
Para